The following highways are numbered 433:

Canada
Manitoba Provincial Road 433
Newfoundland and Labrador Route 433

Japan
 Japan National Route 433

United States
  Louisiana Highway 433
  New York State Route 433
 New York State Route 433 (former)
 New York State Route 433 (former)
  Pennsylvania Route 433
  Puerto Rico Highway 433
  Washington State Route 433
  Wyoming Highway 433